Catherine Howard, Countess of Nottingham ( Carey; c. 1547 – 25 February 1603), was a cousin, lady-in-waiting, and close confidante of Elizabeth I of England. She was in attendance on the queen for 44 years.

Life

Catherine Carey was the eldest daughter of Henry Carey, 1st Baron Hunsdon and his wife Anne Morgan, daughter of Sir Thomas Morgan and Anne Whitney.  Hunsdon was Queen Elizabeth's cousin, being the son of Mary Boleyn, and court gossip hinted at a closer connection, since Mary had been the mistress of Henry VIII. Catherine may have joined Elizabeth's household at Hatfield House as a child during the reign of Elizabeth's elder sister Mary. On Elizabeth's accession, Catherine and her younger sister Philadelphia came to court as maids of honour under the auspices of their aunt, Catherine Carey, the queen's first cousin and a Lady of the Bedchamber.

In July 1563, Catherine married Charles Howard (1536–1624), later 2nd Baron Howard of Effingham, Lord High Admiral of England, and first Earl of Nottingham (1597).

Catherine was appointed First Lady of the Bedchamber by 1572. Her daughter Elizabeth, the queen's goddaughter, was a maid of honour from 1576 until 1583, the year of her marriage. Her daughter Frances, dowager Countess of Kildare, and granddaughter Elizabeth Southwell joined her in the queen's inner circle in the 1590s. Her health began to decline in 1601, and she died at Arundel House on 25 February 1603, only weeks before the death of the queen she had served for 45 years. She was buried at Chelsea Old Church on 25 April 1603.

Children
The Earl and Countess of Nottingham had five children:

Frances Howard (buried 11 July 1628). She was married first to Henry FitzGerald, 12th Earl of Kildare. She was secondly married to Henry Brooke, 11th Baron Cobham.
William Howard, 3rd Baron Howard of Effingham (27 December 1577 – 28 November 1615). Summoned to the Lords as 3rd Baron Howard of Effingham. He was married on 7 February 1596/1597 to Anne St John.
Charles Howard, 2nd Earl of Nottingham (17 September 1579 – 3 October 1642). He was married first on 19 May 1597 to Charity White (d. 18 December 1618), daughter to Robert White. Secondly on 22 April 1620 to Mary Cokayne, daughter of Sir William Cockayne who served as Lord Mayor of London in 1619 and Mary Morris.
Margaret Howard, married in 1587 Sir Richard Leveson (died 1605), one child, died in infancy. After a mental breakdown, her wardship was awarded to her brother, William, on the death of Leveson and to her father in 1615.
Elizabeth Howard (buried 31 March 1646). Maid of honour to Elizabeth I (1576 until 1583). She married Sir Robert Southwell (1563 – c. 1598/9) in 1583. One of their daughters, Elizabeth, also a maid of honour to Elizabeth from 1599, was a lover and eventually the third wife of her cousin Sir Robert Dudley, the illegitimate son of the Earl of Leicester and Douglass Sheffield. Another daughter, Frances, married Edward Rodney, and a daughter Catherine (d. 1657) married Sir Greville Verney, 7th Baron Willoughby de Broke (c. 1586 – 1642). Elizabeth Howard was secondly married to John Stewart, 1st Earl of Carrick, (d. 1644).

Notes

References
 

English countesses
Ladies of the Bedchamber
First Ladies of the Bedchamber
1540s births
1603 deaths
People of the Elizabethan era
Catherine
Catherine
Daughters of barons
16th-century English women
16th-century English nobility
17th-century English women
17th-century English nobility
Burials at Chelsea Old Church
Court of Elizabeth I
Wives of knights